Joseph Bernard Hudepohl (born November 16, 1973) is an American former competition swimmer, three-time Olympic medalist, and former world record-holder.

Early years

Hudepohl is a native of Cincinnati, Ohio, and was raised in the suburb of Finneytown. He is a 1992 alumnus of Saint Xavier High School in Cincinnati and graduated from Stanford University in 1997.

Swimming accomplishments 

Joe Hudepohl was the youngest member of the 1992 United States swimming team that competed at the 1992 Summer Olympics in Barcelona, Spain.  He won a gold medal as a member of the victorious 400-meter freestyle relay team, and earned a bronze medal as part of the 4×200-meter freestyle relay team.  Hudepohl also represented the United States at the 1996 Summer Olympics in Atlanta, where he won a gold medal as a member of the 4×200-meter freestyle relay team.

Hudepohl's Olympic accomplishments followed a collegiate and prep swimming career.  He was named National High School Swimmer of the Year in 1992 and won multiple NCAA championships while competing for Stanford University.  He was also a member of two American record relay teams and part of a world record 400-meter freestyle relay team at the 1995 Pan Pacific Championships.

Hudepohl presently works in the growth equity team of Atlanta Capital, a subsidiary of Eaton Vance.

See also

 List of Olympic medalists in swimming (men)
 List of Stanford University people
 World record progression 4 × 100 metres freestyle relay

References

External links
 Eyes on the Gold
 U.S. National High School Records

1974 births
Living people
American male freestyle swimmers
World record setters in swimming
Olympic bronze medalists for the United States in swimming
Olympic gold medalists for the United States in swimming
Swimmers from Cincinnati
St. Xavier High School (Ohio) alumni
Stanford Cardinal men's swimmers
Swimmers at the 1992 Summer Olympics
Swimmers at the 1996 Summer Olympics
Medalists at the 1996 Summer Olympics
Medalists at the 1992 Summer Olympics
People from Hamilton County, Ohio
20th-century American people
21st-century American people